The Nimba snake-eyed skink (Panaspis tristaoi) is a species of lidless skinks in the family Scincidae. The species is found in western Africa.

References

Panaspis
Reptiles described in 1940
Taxa named by Albert Monard